Ivan Manton Marsh (born 24 May 1943) is a former Australian rules footballer who played with Footscray in the Victorian Football League (VFL).

Notes

External links 

		
Ivan Marsh's playing statistics from The VFA Project

Living people
1943 births
Australian rules footballers from Victoria (Australia)
Western Bulldogs players
Braybrook Football Club players
Coburg Football Club players